National Route 18 is a national highway in South Korea connects Jindo County to Gurye County. It established on 14 August 1981.

Main stopovers
South Jeolla Province
 Jindo County - Haenam County - Gangjin County - Jangheung County - Boseong County - Suncheon - Gokseong County - Suncheon - Gurye County

Major intersections

 (■): Motorway
IS: Intersection, IC: Interchange

South Jeolla Province

References

19
Roads in South Jeolla